The Nový Dvůr Monastery (full name Monastery of the Mother of God Nový Dvůr) is the only men's monastery of the Trappist Order in the Czech Republic. It is located in Dobrá Voda part of Toužim in the Karlovy Vary Region, close to the Premonstratensian monastery of Teplá.

Description
The Monastery of the Mother of God Nový Dvůr is a monastery of the Trappist Order originated from a dilapidated Baroque manor house (Nový Dvůr means literally "the New Yard"), that was partially reconstructed and mostly replaced by a modern construction according to a project of British architectural designer John Pawson. It was established in August 2002 as a daughter house of the Sept-Fons Abbey, France. In September 2004 the monastery church was dedicated to Our Lady.

, the monastery is a home of about twenty monks, who manufacture several products: face cream "Crème Réparatrice" with an extract of corn sprouts, linden and orange tree with ECOCERT certification; four sorts of mustard (two are produced via organic farming), which are sold next to Czech Republic also in France, Germany, Austria and Hungary. The recipes of both products were created by monks in Nový Dvůr and the other products of Nový Dvůr such as jam, coffee and dietary supplements originate from their home monastery Sept-Fons Abbey in France.

References

Cistercian monasteries in the Czech Republic
Buildings and structures in the Karlovy Vary Region
Karlovy Vary District